April Phumo (1 April 1937 – 27 November 2011) was a South African football player and coach. He was nicknamed "Styles".

Early life
April Phumo was born in Johannesburg on 1 April 1937.

Playing career
He was a squad member of the South African national team prior to the 1966 FIFA World Cup; the team was banned from competing due to apartheid.

Coaching career

Club sides
Phumo managed Arsenal (Maseru) of Lesotho, leading them to "several league titles and an unexpected place in the last 16 of the African Champions Cup in 1990." He later managed South African club sides Ria Stars, Bloemfontein Celtic, Nathi Lions and Atlie.

Phumo spent a brief spell as manager of United FC during 2009, helping the club gain promotion to South Africa's National First Division.

National sides
Phumo was the first ever manager of the Lesotho national team. Phumo began coaching Lesotho in 1979 and received a FIFA coaching diploma in 1981.

Phumo was involved with the South African men's senior team for a number of years. He was assistant to Trott Moloto and the 2000 African Cup of Nations, before a spell with Ria Stars.

In July 2002, Phumo returned as national team assistant to Ephraim Mashaba. When Mashaba was sacked in January 2004, Phumo became temporary manager, taking control of the national team at the 2004 African Cup of Nations. Phumo also managed the South African men's under-20, men's under-23 and women's senior national teams.

Death
Phumo died of cancer on 27 November 2011, aged 74, at a hospital in Bloemfontein.

References

1937 births
2011 deaths
South Africa national soccer team managers
South African soccer managers
Deaths from cancer in South Africa
Sportspeople from Johannesburg
South African expatriates in Lesotho
Expatriate football managers in Lesotho
Lesotho national football team managers
2004 African Cup of Nations managers